The Violin Concerto in A minor, Op. 53 (B. 96 / B. 108), is a concerto for violin and orchestra composed by Antonín Dvořák in 1879. It was premiered in Prague on October 14, 1883. by František Ondříček, who also gave the Vienna and London premieres. Today it remains an important work in the violin repertoire.

Instrumentation
The concerto is scored for solo violin and an orchestra consisting of 2 flutes, 2 oboes 2 clarinets (in A), 2 bassoons, 4 horns, 2 trumpets, timpani, and strings.

Structure

The structure of the concerto is the classical three movements, fast–slow–fast.

The first movement and the second movement are interconnected (attacca subito).

History

Dvořák was inspired to write the concerto after meeting Joseph Joachim in 1878, and composed the work with the intention of dedicating it to him. However, when he finished the concerto in 1879, Joachim became skeptical about it. Joachim was a strict classicist and objected, inter alia, to Dvořák's abrupt truncation of the first movement's orchestral tutti. Joachim also didn't like the fact that the recapitulation was cut short and that it led directly to the slow second movement. It is also assumed that he was upset with the persistent repetition found in the third movement. However, Joachim never said anything outright and instead claimed to be editing the solo part. He never actually performed the piece in public.

The concerto was first performed in the United States on October 30, 1891, at the Auditorium Theatre in Chicago. Max Bendix was soloist with the Chicago Orchestra led by Theodore Thomas.

External links
 
Info on a comprehensive Dvorak site
 Dvořák's Violin Concerto, Chicago Symphony Orchestra: 125 Moments

References

Compositions by Antonín Dvořák
Dvorak
1879 compositions
Compositions in A minor